Chandausi railway station is located in Sambhal district in the Indian state of  Uttar Pradesh and serves Chandausi. Chandausi Junction railway station lies on the Aligarh–Bareilly rail route. It is served by the Northern Railways. The main train connections include Dadar–Bareilly Express, Dehradun–Allahabad Link Express, Muzzaffarpur–Delhi Sadhbhavana Express and Sultanpur–Delhi Sadbhawna Express

History
After connecting Varanasi with Lucknow, the Oudh and Rohilkhand Railway started working west of Lucknow and it reached Bareilly in 1873. A line connecting Moradabad to Chandausi was also built in 1872 and it was continued up to Bareilly in 1873. The Bareilly–Moradabad chord was completed in 1894. The former main line became Chandausi Loop and the one via Rampur became main line. It was extended to Shahranpur in 1886.
A branch line to Aligarh was opened in 1894.

Electrification
The survey for railway electrification of the Moradabad–Aligarh line, including the Chandausi–Bareilly sector, was sanctioned in the budget for 2012–13.

References

External links
Trains at Chandausi

Railway stations in Sambhal district
Moradabad railway division
Chandausi